Nguyễn Trọng Hoàng (born 14 April 1989) is a Vietnamese footballer who is currently playing midfielder for Sông Lam Nghệ An of the V.League 1 and a former player for the Vietnam national football team. He is widely considered by the Vietnamese press as one of the most promising talents of his generation.

Club career
After the departure of Lê Công Vinh to Hà Nội T&T F.C. in 2009, Trọng Hoàng was given Công Vinh's number 9 and since then, he has become an important part of Sông Lam Nghệ An.
His performance helped SLNA win third place in the 2009 V-League season and 2010 Vietnamese Cup title. In the financial turmoil that affected most V-League clubs after the 2012 season, SLNA was unable to arrange a financial contract with Trọng Hoàng. The contract between Trọng Hoàng and SLNA expired on 2 January 2012.

International career
In 2007, Trọng Hoàng was in Alfred Riedl's plan for the 2007 Southeast Asian Games. However, he was left out because he had to take the final exam for his high school studies.

In 2009, Trọng Hoàng was again chosen to play in the 2009 Southeast Asian Games by Henrique Calisto. Trọng Hoàng scored in the third game of the tournament against Malaysia. However, he was injured when he played against Cambodia, which prevented him from playing in the semi-final. In the tournament's final, Trọng Hoàng came on as the substitute but the team lost against Malaysia in the final and received the silver medal. Despite the loss, the team's performance in the tournament was impressive enough that Trọng Hoàng is one of the few players who were called up to play in the national team.

In 2010, he was again chosen to play in the 2010 Asian Games in Guangzhou, in which he scored two goals against Turkmenistan and Bahrain to help Vietnam proceed into the second round for the first time in history. The team lost to North Korea, but he was then selected to play in the 2010 AFF Suzuki Cup. In the first game, Trọng Hoàng scored two goals against Myanmar after he came on at the 72–minute. The team came on to win 7–1.

International

International goals

Vietnam U-23

Vietnam
Scores and results list Vietnam's goal tally first.

Honour

Club
Sông Lam Nghệ An F.C.
 Champions V.League 1: 2011
 Champions Vietnamese Super Cup: 2011
 Champions Vietnamese National Cup: 2010

Becamex Bình Dương F.C.
 Champions V.League 1: 2014, 2015
 Champions Vietnamese Super Cup: 2014, 2015
 Champions Vietnamese National Cup: 2015
 Runner-up Vietnamese National Cup: 2014

Viettel FC
 Champions V.League 1: 2020

International
Vietnam
AFF Championship: 
 Winners : 2018

King's Cup: 
 Runners-up : 2019

Vietnam Olympic
 Runners-up : Southeast Asian Games: 2009
 Winners : Southeast Asian Games: 2019

Individual
 2016 AFF Championship: Best Eleven
 ASEAN Football Federation Best XI: 2017'''

References

1989 births
Living people
Vietnamese footballers
Vietnam international footballers
Song Lam Nghe An FC players
Becamex Binh Duong FC players
Thanh Hóa FC players
V.League 1 players
People from Nghệ An province
Association football midfielders
Association football forwards
Footballers at the 2010 Asian Games
Southeast Asian Games silver medalists for Vietnam
Southeast Asian Games medalists in football
2019 AFC Asian Cup players
Competitors at the 2009 Southeast Asian Games
Asian Games competitors for Vietnam
Competitors at the 2019 Southeast Asian Games
Southeast Asian Games gold medalists for Vietnam